is a Japanese choreographer and dancer who was born in Tokyo and became known for founding a company named KARAS along with Kei Miyata in 1985. On September 12, 2013, he performed Mirror and Music at the Kennedy Center which was highly praised by the London Evening Standard. He is teaching at Tama Art University department of Scenography Design, Drama, and Dance as a professor.

Honours
 Medal with Purple Ribbon (2009)
Person of Cultural Merit (2022)

References

Living people
Contemporary dance
Japanese male dancers
Japanese choreographers
Japanese contemporary artists
Persons of Cultural Merit
People from Tokyo
Recipients of the Medal with Purple Ribbon
Year of birth missing (living people)